XHPSEB-FM is a radio station on 104.9 FM in Santiago Juxtlahuaca, Oaxaca. It is owned by the Vera Hernández family and is known as La GranDiosa de Huajuapan.

XHPSEB broadcasts from studios in Col. Jardín de la Soledad in Juxtlahuaca and shares its tower with co-owned XHVMT-FM 106.9, a community radio station, and XHPTEC-FM 99.1.

History
XHPSEB was awarded in the IFT-4 radio auction of 2017 and came to air in June 2019 alongside XHVMT and XHPTEC. The Vera Hernández family, which owns the concessionaires of XHPIXT-FM as well as XHPLEO-FM in Huajuapan de León and XHPIXT-FM in Asunción Nochixtlán, is involved in the leather business.

References

Radio stations in Oaxaca
Radio stations established in 2019
2019 establishments in Mexico